Noli me tangere ('touch me not') is the Latin version of a phrase spoken, according to John 20:17, by Jesus to Mary Magdalene when she recognized him after his resurrection. The biblical scene has been portrayed in numerous works of Christian art from Late Antiquity to the present. The phrase has also been used in literature, and later in a variation by military units since the late 18th century.

The original Koine Greek phrase,  (mḗ mou háptou), is better represented in translation as "cease holding on to me" or "stop clinging to me", i.e. an ongoing action, not one done in a single moment.

Interpretation
According to Maurice Zundel (1897–1975), in asking Mary Magdalene not to touch him, Jesus indicates that once the resurrection is accomplished, the link between human beings and his person must no longer be physical, but must be a bond of heart to heart. "He must establish this gap, she must understand that the only possible way is faith, that the hands can not reach the person and that it is from within, from within only, that the we can approach Him." Likewise, later, when Thomas reached out to touch the wounds of Jesus, Christ declares: "blessed are those who have not seen and yet have believed" [] because "He knows it is useless."

Christians of Western catholic tradition, namely Roman Catholics, Lutherans, and Anglicans, would say this statement is to be received in relation to the Ascension of Jesus. That is, because he had not yet ascended to the right hand of God, it was more of a "not yet" statement rather than a "never" cling to me. Jesus became incarnate for the sake of humanity and is explicitly said to retain his human body. When Jesus ascended to the right hand of the Father, he "fills all things" (e.g. Eph. 1:23), and can properly be clung to in the means of grace he provides, such as in the Eucharist.

Liturgical use

The words are a popular trope in Gregorian chant.  The supposed moment in which they were spoken was a popular subject for paintings in cycles of the Life of Christ and as single subjects, for which the phrase is the usual title.

In the Eastern Orthodox Church, the Gospel lesson on Noli me tangere is one of the Twelve Matins Gospels read during the All Night Vigil on Sunday mornings.

Echoes

In medicine
In medicine, the words were occasionally used to describe a disease known to medieval physicians as a "hidden cancer" or cancer absconditus; the more the swellings associated with these cancers were handled, the worse they became.

Botany
The touch-me-not balsam is known by the binominal name Impatiens noli-tangere; its seed pods can explode when touched, dispersing the seeds widely. Hibiscus noli-tangere has sharp glass-like needles that detach from its leaves when touched.

In culture and literature
Like other significant scenes in the Gospels, this expression was used repeatedly in Christian culture, specifically literature.  Following 14th century poet Petrarch, 16th-century poet Sir Thomas Wyatt, in his lyric poem "Whoso list to hunt", says the speaker is hunting a hind, who stands for the elusive lover. The doe wears an inscribed collar: "There is written, her fair neck round about: / Noli me tangere, for Caesar's I am".  Pliny the Elder had an account about deer of "Caesar", which lived 300 years and wore collars with that inscription. In another source, Solinus (fl. 3rd century AD) wrote that after Alexander the Great collared deer, they survived 100 years. He did not mention any inscription on the collars.

D. H. Lawrence refers to the phrase on several occasions, most notably in his poem "Noli Me Tangere" satirizing cerebralism.

Filipino poet and activist José Rizal used this phrase as the title of his novel, Noli Me Tángere (1887), criticizing the Spanish colonization of the Philippines. He writes that  ophthalmologists use this phrase in reference to a cancer of the eyelids. It symbolized the people's blindness to the ruling government, which Rizal deemed a social cancer that people were too afraid to touch.

The thirteen-hour version of the experimental film Out 1 (1971) is sometimes subtitled Noli Me Tangere, as an ironic reference to it being the uncut version favoured by the director Jacques Rivette (as opposed to the edited version, Out 1: Spectre, which is four hours long).

In United States history and military

Historically, the phrase was used by Revolutionary-Era Americans in reference to the Gadsden flag—with its derivation "don't tread on me"—and other representations dating to the American Revolutionary War. 

In the United States military, the phrase is the motto of the US Army's oldest infantry regiment, the 3rd U.S. Infantry Regiment (The Old Guard), located at Fort Myer, Virginia. The snake symbol can be found in the coat of arms of the 369th Infantry Regiment, known as the Harlem Hellfighters. "Don't tread on me" is also used in the First Navy Jack of United States Navy. It is also the motto of the U.S Army 4th Infantry Regiment, located in Hohenfels, Germany. The Royal Air Force adopted this motto for the No. 103 (Bomber) Squadron.

Relic
A piece of forehead flesh covered by skin, previously attached to the alleged skull of Mary Magadalene, is kept in the cathedral of Saint-Maximin-la-Sainte-Baume in southern France. The relic is purported to be from the spot above Mary's temple touched by Jesus at the post-resurrection encounter in the garden.

Artistic representation
The biblical scene of Mary Magdalene's recognizing Jesus Christ after his resurrection was repeatedly represented as the subject in a long, widespread, and continuous iconographic tradition in Christian art from Late Antiquity until today. Pablo Picasso, for example, used the c. 1525 painting Noli me tangere by Antonio da Correggio, stored in the Museo del Prado, as an iconographic source for his 1903 painting La Vie (Cleveland Museum of Art) from his so-called Blue Period.

See also
 Life of Jesus in the New Testament
 Post-resurrection appearances of Jesus
 Noli Me Tángere (novel)
 Noli me tangere casket
 Nemo me impune lacessit – "no one assails me with impunity"

References

Bibliography
Bieringer, R; B. Baert; K. Demasure. 2016. "Noli mi tangere" in interdiciplinary perspective. Bristol, CN: Peeters.−

External links

Eastern Christian liturgy
Gospel of John
Iconography of Jesus
Latin religious words and phrases
Liturgy of the Hours
Mary Magdalene
 
Sayings of Jesus
Vulgate Latin words and phrases
Post-resurrection appearances of Jesus